João Emir Porto Pereira (born 17 March 1989) is a Brazilian professional footballer who currently plays for Hong Kong Premier League club Tai Po.

Emir primarily plays as a central midfielder, but he also plays as an attacking midfielder.

Club career

South China
On 29 December 2011, South China announced that Emir, alongside Dhiego Martins and Yeo Jee-Hoon, had joined the club. He made his debut for South China on 4 February 2012 at Mong Kok Stadium, helping help the team secure a 4–2 win over Sun Hei.

On 23 March 2012, chairman Steven Lo confirmed that Emir was ruled out for the season due to torn ligament.

On 10 July 2012, chairman Steven Lo confirmed the departure of Emir due to contract problem with his previous club.

Return to South China
On 31 May 2013, Emir rejoined Hong Kong First Division side South China.

Pegasus
Emir joined Pegasus on 20 August 2015. On 7 July 2017, it was confirmed by Pegasus that he had signed a new contract for the upcoming HKPL season.

Tai Po
On 31 December 2018, it was announced that Pegasus had reached an agreement with Tai Po to swap Emir in exchange for David Lazari.

Eastern
On 17 July 2019, Emir signed for Eastern.

Tai Po
On 8 August 2022, Emir returned to Tai Po.

Career stats

Club
 As of 31 December 2018. The following table only shows statistics in Hong Kong.

Honours

Club
Eastern
 Hong Kong Senior Shield: 2019–20
 Hong Kong FA Cup: 2019–20

South China
 Hong Kong Senior Shield: 2013–14

Pegasus
 Hong Kong FA Cup: 2015–16
 Hong Kong Sapling Cup: 2015–16

Tai Po
 Hong Kong Premier League: 2018–19

References

External links
 
 

1989 births
Living people
Association football midfielders
Brazilian footballers
Brazilian expatriate footballers
Hong Kong Premier League players
South China AA players
TSW Pegasus FC players
Tai Po FC players
Eastern Sports Club footballers
Expatriate footballers in Hong Kong
Grêmio Esportivo Brasil players
People from Pelotas
Hong Kong League XI representative players
Sportspeople from Rio Grande do Sul